Cheung Hok-ming  (born 3 July 1952, in Lam Tsuen, Tai Po, Hong Kong) is a former councillor in the Legislative Council of Hong Kong representing the New Territories West constituency. A Hakka, he is also the chairman of Tai Po District Council and the vice-chairman of Heung Yee Kuk.  He is a member of The Democratic Alliance for the Betterment and Progress of Hong Kong party and supports pro-government policies.

Cheung is currently the chairman of the Tai Po Football Club.

References 

1952 births
District councillors of Tai Po District
Indigenous inhabitants of the New Territories in Hong Kong
Hong Kong people of Hakka descent
Living people
Members of the Executive Council of Hong Kong
Heung Yee Kuk
Democratic Alliance for the Betterment and Progress of Hong Kong politicians
New Territories Association of Societies politicians
Members of the National Committee of the Chinese People's Political Consultative Conference
HK LegCo Members 2004–2008
HK LegCo Members 2008–2012
Recipients of the Grand Bauhinia Medal
Recipients of the Gold Bauhinia Star
Recipients of the Silver Bauhinia Star
Members of the Selection Committee of Hong Kong
Members of the Election Committee of Hong Kong, 2017–2021
Members of the Election Committee of Hong Kong, 2021–2026